Shaker Run is a 1985 New Zealand action film directed by Bruce Morrison and starring Cliff Robertson, Leif Garrett, and Lisa Harrow. It follows a stunt driver Pierson and his ace mechanic Lee on the run from secret police in the South Island of New Zealand with Doctor Rubin, who has stolen a manufactured virus from the government lab where she works, (filmed at Larnach Castle) with the intent of delivering it to the CIA.

The "Shaker" of the title refers to the pink and black Trans Am used by the three to outrun the NZ secret service.

Cast
 Cliff Robertson as Judd Pierson
 Leif Garrett as Casey Lee
 Lisa Harrow as Dr. Christine Rubin
 Shane Briant as Paul Thoreau
 Peter Rowell as Mr. Carney
 Peter Hayden as Michael Connoly
 Ian Mune as Barry Gordon
 Bruce Phillips as Dr. Marshall
 Fiona Samuel as Casey's Girl
 Nathaniel Lees as Squad Commander
 Igo Kantor as CIA Man
 Shona Laing as Singer

References

External links
 Shaker Run at the New Zealand Film Archive
 
 

1980s English-language films
1985 films
1985 action films
Dunedin in fiction
Films about automobiles
New Zealand action films
Wellington in fiction